Antoni Trenchev is a former Member of the National Assembly of the Republic of Bulgaria and a cryptocurrency businessperson. He is also a co-founder of Nexo.

Early life
Antoni Antoniev Trenchev was born on March 15, 1987, in Munich.

Trenchev studied finance law at King’s College London and Humboldt University of Berlin. After college, he worked in the hedge fund industry before turning his attention to financial technology.

Political career
Trenchev was elected to the National Assembly of the Republic of Bulgaria in 2014, serving until 2017, where he sat with the Reformist Bloc party. His committee work included sitting on the European Affairs and Oversight of the European Funds Committee, Committee on Supervision of the Committee on Energy and Water Regulation, and several ad hoc committees. He was also deputy head of the Delegation to the Parliamentary Assembly of the Council of Europe. 
In the Council of Europe, he served on the Committee on Social Affairs, Health and Sustainable Development in 2015, Sub-Committee on relations with the OECD and the EBRD from 2015 to 2016, the Committee on Political Affairs and Democracy from 2015 to 2017, and an alternative on the Committee on Social Affairs, Health and Sustainable Development during the same period.

Business career
Trenchev is the managing partner at the cryptocurrency lender Nexo Capital Inc. He is also a news advocate for the industry and television commentator on cable channels including CNBC and Bloomberg.

References

Members of the National Assembly (Bulgaria)
1987 births
Living people
21st-century Bulgarian politicians
21st-century Bulgarian businesspeople
Reformist Bloc politicians